Anikino is a rural locality (a village) in Kultayevskoye Rural Settlement, Permsky District, Perm Krai, Russia. The population was 28 as of 2010. There are 6 streets.

Geography 
Anikino is located 26 km southwest of Perm (the district's administrative centre) by road. Kultayevo is the nearest rural locality.

References 

Rural localities in Permsky District